Việt Cường may refer to:

People
Viet Cuong (composer) (born 1990), U.S. composer

Places
Việt Cường may also refer to several commune-level subdivisions in Vietnam, including:

Việt Cường, Hưng Yên, a commune of Yên Mỹ District
Việt Cường, Yên Bái, a commune of Trấn Yên District

See also
Đoàn Việt Cường, a Vietnamese footballer